Jerry Green (born c. 1944) was a college basketball coach from the 1980s through 2001. He was the head coach at UNC Asheville, the University of Oregon, and the University of Tennessee. He also was an assistant at the University of Kansas under Roy Williams.

In his four years at Kansas (1988–1992) under Williams, he helped the Jayhawks to a  record and the 1991 national title game. Previously, he spent twelve seasons at UNC Asheville, three as an assistant coach (1976–1979) and his last nine as head coach (1979–1988). Green helped guide Asheville through two major changes in the last three years of his tenure. The Bulldogs made the move up from the NAIA level to the ranks of NCAA Division II, and then became a Division I program for Green's final two seasons. His teams posted a combined  record.

Green was the head coach at Oregon from 1992–97, where in 1995 he led the Ducks to their first NCAA tournament appearance since 1961. In April 1997, he was hired by Tennessee, then resigned four years later in March 2001. Green led the Volunteers to four consecutive NCAA tournament appearances, and was succeeded by Buzz Peterson.

He was the Director of Basketball Operations at Indiana University, but has since retired.

Head coaching record

References

1943 births
Living people
College men's basketball head coaches in the United States
Kansas Jayhawks men's basketball coaches
Oregon Ducks men's basketball coaches
Tennessee Volunteers basketball coaches
UNC Asheville Bulldogs men's basketball coaches